Quintana de la Serena is a municipality located in the province of Badajoz, Extremadura, Spain. According to the 2005 census (INE), the municipality has a population of 5347 inhabitants.

It has a lot of granite around and quarries are its first economic motor.

References

Municipalities in the Province of Badajoz